Mountain Brook may refer to:

Places in the United States
Mountain Brook, Alabama, a city in southeastern Jefferson County, Alabama
Mountain Brook School System, a public school system in Mountain Brook, Alabama
Mountain Brook High School, a three-year public high school within the Mountain Brook School System
Mountain Brook (New York), a tributary of the Little Delaware River near Bovina, New York

Livings things
Mountain brook frogs, a genus of frogs in the family Hylidae
Ichthyomyzon greeleyi, also known as the mountain brook lamprey